Ann Elizabeth Koch Schonberger (1940–2022) was a professor at the University of Maine.

Early life and education
Schonberger was born in Madison, Wisconsin. She was educated at Wellesley College. Later, she graduated from Harvard University with a master's degree and finished her PhD in mathematics at the University of Wisconsin. In 1971, she married Howard Schonberger, a history professor.

Career
In 1973, she joined University of Maine and became a faculty member.

In 1991, she became the director of University of Maine's Women's Studies program and women in the curriculum program.

In 2013, she retired as a professor.

Awards
 Maine Public Broadcasting Jefferson Award for Public Service in 1988
 University of Maine Presidential Public Service Award in 2001
 Inducted into National Women's Hall of Fame in 2004
 Merle Nelson Award in 2006

References

1941 births
2022 deaths
Wellesley College alumni
Harvard University alumni
University of Wisconsin–Madison alumni
University of Maine faculty
Academics from Wisconsin
People from Madison, Wisconsin